The term Heptanese School of literature (literally: "The School of the Seven Islands", also known as the Ionian School) denotes the literary production of the Ionian Island's literature figures from the late 18th century till the end of the 19th century. The center of this production is considered to be the poet Dionysios Solomos, so its periods are conventionally divided as follows: Pre-Solomian poets (Προσολωμικοί ποιητές), Solomian poets, Post-Solomian poets, Minors and Descendants.

General traits
Some general traits of the Ionian style were:
the use of Dimotiki instead of Katharevousa (with some exceptions, mainly Kalvos),
the manifest influence that the contemporary Italian poets had in its thematology, that is regarding the depiction of real-life scenes,
the worship of homeland,
the worship of nature,
a "romantic impulse" (also described as folkloric idealism),
an emphasis on the importance of love and freedom,
an appreciation of religion's role in man's life.

Notable representatives
Mikelis Avlichos
Andreas Kalvos
Andreas Laskaratos
Antonios Martelaos
Gerasimos Markoras
Antonios Matesis
Lorentzos Mavilis
Iakovos Polylas
Dionysios Solomos
Georgios Tertsetis
Aristotelis Valaoritis
Ioannis Zambelios

Notable works
 Hymn to Liberty (1823) by Dionysios Solomos (national anthem of Greece)
 The Free Besieged by Solomos
 Vasilikos (1859), play by Antonios Matesis
 The mysteries of Cephalonia (1872) by Andreas Laskaratos
 Idou o anthropos (1886) by Andreas Laskaratos

Gallery

References
Beaton, Roderick. "An Introduction to Modern Greek Literature", Oxford University Press, USA, 1999. 
Πολίτης Λ., "Ιστορία της Νεοελληνικής Λογοτεχνίας" (History of Modern Greek Literature), XI ed., ed. Μ.Ι.Ε.Τ. (National Bank of Greece Cultural Foundation), Athens, 2001. (in Greek)
 

 
Dionysios Solomos
Greek artist groups and collectives